Sex Packets is the debut studio album by American hip hop group Digital Underground, released on .

Album background
The album is a concept album about "G.S.R.A." (Genetic Suppression Relief Antidotes), a pharmaceutical substance that is produced in the form of a large glowing pill about the size of a quarter, which comes in a condom-sized package and is allegedly developed by the government to provide its intended users such as astronauts with a satisfying sexual experience in situations where the normal attainment of such experiences would be counter-productive to the mission at hand.

Release and reception

The album was released in the spring of 1990 following the success of its two lead-off singles: "Doowutchyalike", a moderate club hit, followed by "The Humpty Dance", which reached No. 11 on the pop chart, No. 7 on the R&B chart, and No. 1 on the Billboard Rap Singles chart. Sex Packets was released to positive reviews and eventually achieved platinum sales. The album was re-issued on February 8, 2005 by Rhino Entertainment. The album is broken down track-by-track by Digital Underground in Brian Coleman's book Check the Technique.

Legacy

In 1998, the album was selected as one of The Sources 100 Best Rap Albums Ever. It is included in the book 1001 Albums You Must Hear Before You Die.

Track listing

CD

LP

Cassette

The cassette version of the album has 3 extra tracks, plus an extended version of "Gutfest '89"

Samples
"Underwater Rimes (Remix)"
"Chameleon" by Herbie Hancock
"Aqua Boogie (A Psychoalphadiscobetabioaquadoloop)" by Parliament
"Paul Revere" by Beastie Boys
"Doowutchyalike"
"I Get Lifted" by KC & the Sunshine Band
"Flash Light" by Parliament
"Bounce, Rock, Skate, Roll" by Vaughan Mason & Crew
"Good Times" by Chic
"Agony of Defeet" by Parliament
"Sexuality" by Prince
"Ain't No Half Steppin'" by Big Daddy Kane
"Atomic Dog" by George Clinton
"Keep Risin' to the Top" by Doug E. Fresh
"Packet Man"
"Four Play" by Fred Wesley and The Horny Horns
"The Humpty Dance"
"Sing a Simple Song" by Sly & the Family Stone
"Humpty Dump" by The Vibrettes
"Theme from the Black Hole" by Parliament
"Let's Play House" by Parliament
"Freaks of the Industry"
"Love to Love You Baby" by Donna Summer
"Gutfest '89"
"Theme From the Planets" by Dexter Wansel
"Rhymin' on the Funk"
"Flash Light" by Parliament
"Sex Packets"
"Dr. Funkenstein (Live)" by Parliament
”The Motor-Booty Affair” by Parliament
"She's Always in My Hair" by Prince
"The Danger Zone"
"Flash Light" by Parliament
"Bootzilla" by Bootsy's Rubber Band
"You're a Customer" by EPMD
"The Way We Swing"
"Who Knows" by Jimi Hendrix

Charts

Weekly charts

Year-end charts

Certifications

References

External links

Sex Packets (Adobe Flash) at Radio3Net (streamed copy where licensed)
Sex Packets (US Release) (Adobe Flash) at Myspace (streamed copy where licensed)

1990 debut albums
Digital Underground albums
Tommy Boy Records albums
Concept albums